This is a list of fellows of the Royal Society elected in 1902.

Fellows
Ferdinand von Richthofen  (1833–1905)
Hans Peter Jurgen Julius Thomsen  (1826–1909)
Edward Saunders  (1848–1910)
John Brown  (1850–1911)
Rubert William Boyce  (1863–1911)
Henry Taylor Bovey  (1850–1912)
George William Hill  (1838–1914)
Herman Graf zu Solms-Laubach  (1842–1915)
Richard Everard Webster Viscount Alverstone (1842–1915)
Sir James Stirling  (1836–1916)
Jean Gaston Darboux  (1842–1917)
Karl Ewald Konstantin Hering  (1834–1918)
Sydney Samuel Hough  (1870–1923)
Robert Kidston  (1852–1924)
Walter Hume Long 1st Viscount Long of Wraxall (1854–1924)
Sir George Dashwood Taubman Goldie  (1846–1925)
Albert Abraham Michelson  (1852–1931)
Sir Horace Curzon Plunkett  (1854–1932)
Sir William Bate Hardy  (1864–1934)
Herbert Brereton Baker  (1862–1935)
Thomas Mather  (1856–1937)
Alfred Harker  (1859–1939)
Sir William Jackson Pope  (1870–1939)
Waldemar Christofer Brogger  (1851–1940)
John Henry Michell  (1863–1940)
Sir William Matthew Flinders Petrie  (1853–1942)
Arthur Willey  (1867–1942)
Hugh Frank Newall  (1857–1944)

References

1902
1902 in the United Kingdom
1902 in science